Valentine Hall and Oliver Campbell won their first doubles title at the U.S. championships.

Draw

References 
 

U.S. National Championships - Men's Doubles
U.S. National Championships (tennis) by year – Men's doubles